Debra Lynn Dean (born 1957) is an American writer, best known for her 2006 novel, The Madonnas of Leningrad.

Life
Dean was born and brought up in Seattle and studied English and Drama at Whitman College, graduating in 1980. She then trained as an actress in New York City, where she married another actor, and worked mostly in theatre until returning to the Pacific Northwest to study for a Master of Fine Arts at the University of Oregon. She now teaches creative writing at Florida International University, where she is an associate professor of English.

Works
The Madonnas of Leningrad (New York: William Morrow, 2006)
Confessions of a Falling Woman (New York: HarperCollins, 2008)
The Mirrored World (New York: Harper Perennial, 2013)
 Hidden Tapestry: Jan Yoors, His Two Wives, and the War That Made Them One (Evanston, Illinois: Northwestern University Press, 2018)

References

External links

http://therumpus.net/2014/07/the-rumpus-interview-with-debra-dean/
http://www.nupress.northwestern.edu/content/hidden-tapestry 
http://theweek.com/articles/443353/susan-vreelands-6-favorite-books-that-blend-fiction-art-history

Living people
1957 births
American women novelists
American historical novelists
Writers from Seattle
Whitman College alumni
Writers from Miami
21st-century American novelists
21st-century American women writers
Novelists from Washington (state)
Novelists from Florida
University of Oregon alumni
Florida International University faculty
American women academics